Lac Gregory is a body of fresh water crossed from north to south by the Tourilli River, located in the Laurentides Wildlife Reserve, in the unorganized territory of Lac-Croche, in the La Jacques-Cartier Regional County Municipality, administrative region of Capitale-Nationale, in province from Quebec, to Canada.

The watershed of Gregory Lake is served by a few secondary forest roads for the needs of forestry and recreational tourism activities.

Forestry is the main economic activity in the sector; recreational tourism, second.

The surface of Lake Gregory is generally frozen from the beginning of December to the end of March; safe circulation on the ice is generally done from the end of December to the beginning of March.

Geography 
This lake between the mountains is akin to the following three bays:
 the first stretches over  towards the north while bending towards the east and receives the discharge of Lac des Doradilles, as well as the discharge of a set of lakes including Hunau, Crochetière Oyster mushrooms;

From the mouth of Gregory Lake, the current descends on  generally towards the south, following the course of the Tourilli river to its confluence with the Sainte-Anne River; thence, the current generally flows south along the current of the Sainte-Anne river to the northeast bank of the Saint-Laurent river.

Toponymy 
The toponym "Lac Gregory" was formalized on December 5, 1968, by the Commission de toponymie du Québec.

See also 

 Laurentides Wildlife Reserve
 La Jacques-Cartier Regional County Municipality
 Lac-Jacques-Cartier, an unorganized territory
 Tourilli Lake
 Tourilli River
 Sainte-Anne River
 List of lakes of Canada

Notes and references

Bibliography 
 

Lakes of Capitale-Nationale
La Jacques-Cartier Regional County Municipality
Laurentides Wildlife Reserve